Hughes Bluff is a conspicuous rock and ice bluff,  high, along the south side of David Glacier,  west of Cape Reynolds, in Victoria Land, Antarctica. It was mapped by the United States Geological Survey from surveys and U.S. Navy tricamera aerial photography, 1957–62, and was named by the Advisory Committee on Antarctic Names for Garrett A. Hughes, a United States Antarctic Research Program researcher (cosmic radiation) at McMurdo Station in 1966.

References

Cliffs of Victoria Land
Scott Coast